Al Norte del Sur is a 1988 studio album by Franco De Vita released on the CBS Records label. The CD produced four hit singles: "Louis",  "Te Amo", "Promesas" and "Esta Vez." All four singles reached the Top 10 on the Billboard Latin music charts in the United States.

Track listing
All songs written by Franco De Vita.
  "Te Equivocaste Conmigo" 5:05
    "Louis" 5:23
   "Te Amo" 3:45
    "Un Poco De Respeto" 3:45
    "Aun Vivo" 3:42
   "Soy Como Soy" 4:05
   "Promesas" 4:13
  "Esta Vez" 3:50
 "Loco De Atar" 3:51
 "Plaza De Centro" 4:15
   "Al Norte Del Sur" 2:35

1988 albums
Franco De Vita albums
CBS Records albums